K. C. Potter (born 1939) is an American academic administrator. He is a dean emeritus of residential and judicial affairs at Vanderbilt University. Potter is recognized for his pioneering support of LGBTQ rights at Vanderbilt. The Vanderbilt K. C. Potter Center is named in his honor and houses the Office for LGBTQI Life.

Early life and education 
Potter was born in 1939 in Fallsburg, Kentucky. He earned a B.A. from Berea College in 1961. Potter completed a J.D. degree at Vanderbilt University Law School in 1964. While attending law school, Potter worked as an assistant resident adviser.

Career 
He worked as a law clerk for the Tennessee Supreme Court and was admitted to the Tennessee Bar Association. In 1965, Potter became the assistant dean of men. In this role, he oversaw housing, discipline, and the Vanderbilt police department. Common issues Potter dealt with included drunkenness, date rape, theft, noise complaints, and beatings. In the late 1960s, a student requested to change his dorm because his roommate is gay. Potter authorized the room change. A year later, the roommate jumped out of one of the 12-story towers on campus. Potter thinks the suicide was likely the result of an internal struggle with his sexuality and the conservative environment of Vanderbilt. This is a moment that impacted Potter's career. In 1971, after the offices of dean of men and women were combined, he was made associate dean in the Office of Student Life. In 1977, Potter became the dean of residential and judicial affairs where he worked as the chief arbiter and addressed student conduct. He also managed the campus housing, fraternities and sororities, and LGBTQ student issues.  In 1987, a homophobic article in the student paper was published. Potter went to his supervisor, the associate provost, to reach out to the LGBT students. He led the first initiative to create a safe space for LGBTQ students on campus that year. In the fall, Potter started a regular meet up group for LGBT students to convene at his house on campus. A few years later, Potter supported the newly formed student gay rights group in their effort to establish a formalized university nondiscrimination policy. Potter established congressional-style hearings to develop a policy and to testify to the board of trustees.

Personal life and legacy 
Potter resided on the Vanderbilt campus in one of Cumberland's West Side Row cottages. He retired in June 1998. Potter did not come out of the closet as a gay man until after his retirement. Shortly thereafter, he began his first real relationship with his partner, Richard Patrick. They live together on their farm in Hickman County, Tennessee.

In 2008, his former residence, Euclid House, became the K.C. Potter Center in honor of his support of inclusiveness and the LGBTQI community. It houses the Office of LGBTQI Life. In 2015, Potter was featured in the documentary film, A Secret Only God Knows. It chronicles the LGBTQ community in Middle Tennessee before 1970. The documentary premiered on Nashville public television and includes interviews conducted by the Brooks Fund History Project that are archived in the special collections division at Nashville Public Library. In 2019, Potter's efforts to support LGBTQ rights were featured in The Book of Pride. Released in 2019, Potter is featured in the short documentary Show Me the Way that shares how he was closeted during his entire professional life.

References

External links
 

1939 births
Living people
People from Lawrence County, Kentucky
Berea College alumni
Vanderbilt University Law School alumni
Vanderbilt University administrators
American university and college faculty deans
American LGBT rights activists
LGBT people from Kentucky
LGBT people from Tennessee
Gay academics
People from Hickman County, Tennessee